Makin Tehsil is a subdivision located in South Waziristan district, Khyber Pakhtunkhwa, Pakistan. The population is 58,700 according to the 2017 census. The main town is Makeen.

Notable people
Mulla Powinda
[Malik Muhammad Nawaz Abdallai]
[Malik Haji Muhammad Khan]
Naqeebullah Mehsud

See also 
 Makeen
 List of tehsils of Khyber Pakhtunkhwa

References 

Tehsils of Khyber Pakhtunkhwa
Populated places in South Waziristan